Hasip Pektas (born 1953 in Ermenek, Karaman Province, Turkey) is a Turkish ex-libris artist and academic of fine arts. He graduated from https://gef.gazi.edu.tr/ in 1974. He worked at https://www.hacettepe.edu.tr/english Graphics Department between 1987-2007. He became Associate Professor in 1995 and Professor in 2001. He served as the Dean of HU FFA in 2003-2006. He works at https://www.istinye.edu.tr/en, https://iletisim.istinye.edu.tr/en, Visual Communication Design Department. He wrote a book about "Ex-libris" in 1996. He has organized 5 International Ex-libris Competitions, International Printmaking Biennial, and 33rd FISAE International Ex-libris Congress. He is the Founding President of the http://www.aed.org.tr/en/ and the Director of the http://www.aed.org.tr/en/muze/. Awards: 2022- Vojvodina Ex-libris Association, Emir Kusturica International Ex-libris Competition “Herzegovina Museum Award”. Serbia. 2021- Trakai 700 International Ex-libris Competition “Special Award / Diploma”. Trakai – Lithuania. 2009-Yaroslavl International Ex-libris Competition, "Second Prize". Yaroslavl - Russia. 2008-XXXXII. International Ex-libris Biennial "Honorable Mention". Beijing - China. 2006-IV. International Graphic Biennial “Honorable Mention”. Francavilla al Mare -Italy. 1996-III. Italy-Turkey Ex-libris Biennial, “First Prize”. Ortona - Italy. 1989-AFSAD 7th National Photography Competition, "Ministry of Culture Special Award". 1988-Photography Associations 1st National Competition, Saydam "Achievement Award". 1974-Painter Şeref Akdik Painting Competition, Printmaking "Special Award".

Selected publication
 2017	Pektaş, H. “Ex-libris”, Fourth Edition, İstanbul Ex-libris Society, İstanbul.

References

External links
Official web site
Istanbul Ex-libris Society

Turkish educators
Turkish illustrators
Art educators
Artist authors
Academic staff of Hacettepe University
1953 births
People from Karaman
Living people
Turkish cartoonists